Aleksandr Vitalyevich Zhidkov (born 16 March 1965) is an Azerbaijani football coach and a former goalkeeper. He was also a member of Azerbaijan national football team.

Career
Zhidkov made 21 appearances for the Azerbaijan national football team from 1994 to 1998.

Honours
Individual
Toulon Tournament Best Goalkeeper: 1984

References

External links 

 

1965 births
Living people
People from Budyonnovsk
Soviet footballers
Azerbaijani footballers
Azerbaijan international footballers
Azerbaijani expatriate footballers
Association football goalkeepers
FC Dynamo Kyiv players
Hapoel Tzafririm Holon F.C. players
Expatriate footballers in Israel
Expatriate footballers in Ukraine
Azerbaijani expatriate sportspeople in Israel
Azerbaijani expatriate sportspeople in Ukraine
Expatriate footballers in Austria
FC Anzhi Makhachkala players
FC Tom Tomsk players
FC Admira Wacker Mödling players
Soviet Top League players
Russian Premier League players
Liga Leumit players
Ukrainian Premier League players
Austrian Football Bundesliga players
FC Nyva Vinnytsia players
Neftçi PFK players